Joe Pickett is an American neo-Western crime drama television series based on characters created by novelist C.J. Box. The series is produced by Paramount Television Studios and was initially released on Spectrum Originals, and then on Paramount+. The series stars Michael Dorman, Julianna Guill, Sharon Lawrence, Paul Sparks, Mustafa Speaks, and David Alan Grier.

The first season premiered on December 6, 2021, and consisted of ten episodes. In February 2022, the series was renewed for a second season.

Synopsis 
The series follows the life of a Wyoming game warden and his family in the small town of Saddlestring and the surrounding wilderness of Yellowstone National Park.

Cast

Main 
 Michael Dorman as Joe Pickett
 Julianna Guill as Marybeth Pickett
 Sharon Lawrence as Missy Vankeuren
 Paul Sparks as Wacey Hedeman
 Mustafa Speaks as Nate Romanowski
 Skywalker Hughes as Sheridan Pickett
 Kamryn Pliva as Lucy Pickett
 David Alan Grier as Vern Dunnegan
 Vivienne Guynn as April Keeley (season 2; recurring season 1)
 Chad Rook as Deputy McLanahan (season 2; recurring season 1)
 Aadila Dosani as Deputy Cricket Ludlow (season 2; recurring season 1)
 Keean Johnson as Luke Brueggeman (season 2)

Recurring 
 Leah Gibson as Jeannie Keeley
 Cassie Dzienny as Sadie Pickett
 Kyle Mac as George Pickett
 Jacqueline and Joyce Robbins as Violet and Vivan Bouvier
 Oliver Mandelcorn as young Victor Pickett
Joshua Morettin portrays Victor Pickett as a teenager
 Evie Marsten as Julie Scarlett
 Patrick Gallagher as Sheriff Bud Barnum
 Judith Buchan as Opal Scarlett
 Brendan Fletcher as Arlen Scarlett
 Roger LeBlanc as Hank Scarlett
 Rachel Colwell as Taylor Maldonado
 Zebastin Borjeau portrays a young Joe Pickett

Guest 
 Ben Hollingworth as Ote Keeley
 Malik Elassal as Calvin Mendes
 Owen Crow Shoe as Kyle Lensegrav
 Mark Bellamy as Mitch
 David Haysom as Clyde Lidgard
 David Cubitt as Jerry Kelmeckis
 Lochlyn Munro as Governor Budd

Episodes

Background and production

Cast 
In April 2021, it was announced that Michael Dorman would star in the title role whilst David Alan Grier, Julianna Guill, Sharon Lawrence, Mustafa Speaks, Paul Sparks, Skywalker Hughes and Kamryn Pilva joined the cast as series regulars.

In June 2022, Vivienne Guynn, Chad Rook and Aadila Dosani were promoted to series regulars for the second season. Keean Johnson also joined the cast as a series regular whilst Alex Breaux, Sean Wei Mah, John Ralston, Cheryl De Luca, Chris Gauthier, Emily Alabi, T’áncháy Redvers and Aaron Dean Eisenberg were set to recur.

Development 
In March 2021, Spectrum Originals ordered Joe Pickett straight to series and would be based on C.J. Box's series of novels of the same name. The first season is an adaption of the first and third Joe Pickett novels, Open Season and Winterkill respectively.

Filming 
Although the series' setting is the rural town of Saddlestring, Wyoming, the series was filmed on location around Calgary, specifically the Cochrane area.

In July 2022, the second season started production in Okotoks, Alberta and High River, Alberta.

Themes 
Joe Pickett is part of a resurgence in the Western genre.

Release 
The series was initially a streaming exclusive for Spectrum, having launched in December 2021, during which time it became the most-watched series on the network. The first season was later added to Paramount+.

Reception 
Joe Keller, writing a review for Decider.com, says "Joe Pickett has some unexpected humor among the darkness, and a title character that shows his weaknesses and baggage on his face, even to the people he’s trying to help or arrest. It’s a show that has a more realistic feel and flows a lot better than some of the shows we’ve seen in the Western genre of late."

TV Guide's Matt Roush writes, "I mean it as the highest compliment when I suggest that anyone who followed Longmire from cable to Netflix will find a kindred spirit here. From the early episodes, this also appears to be following the outlines of Box’s disciplined storytelling more faithfully than the bizarrely baroque Big Sky."

References

External links
 
 

2021 American television series debuts
2020s Western (genre) television series
Spectrum Originals original programming
Television series by Paramount Television
Neo-Western television series